Triangles is a fiction novel written by Ellen Hopkins. It is her first adult novel.

Sequel
Triangles will have a young adult sequel titled Tilt.

Reception
Triangles has received several critical reviews, garnering positive reviews from sites such as Publishers Weekly and being one of Entertainment Weekly's "Must Pick" books. Blog Critics said that the book "is a tale that is, on the one hand psychologically disturbing, and on the other hand, a story quite beautifully written." Kirkus Reviews also reviewed the book, praising the narrative in Triangles but saying "the consistently high emotional pitch, along with the constant crises, make this thick volume more soap opera than art, and the verse aspect comes to seem an affectation"

References

External links
Official author page

2011 American novels
Atria Publishing Group books